Antaeotricha argocorys is a moth in the family Depressariidae. It was described by Edward Meyrick in 1931. It is found in Brazil.

References

Moths described in 1931
argocorys
Taxa named by Edward Meyrick
Moths of South America